Astrangia solitaria, the dwarf cup coral or southern cup coral, is a species of stony coral in the family Rhizangiidae. It is native to shallow water in the western Atlantic Ocean and the Caribbean Sea.

Description
New polyps grow on short stolons and the coenosarc (soft tissue) does not cover the skeleton in a continuous sheet as it does in most coral species. The stolons may become abraded leaving the individual polyps completely or semi-separated. The corallites can have 48 septa (stony ridges) but 36 is a more usual number. The septa of adjoining corallites are connected by wide, flat, granular costae (ridges). The colour of this coral is usually pale brown, but the corallites may have brown extremities and white bases, or even be completely white. A. solitaria can be confused with the northern cup coral (Astrangia poculata) but that species usually forms clumps with more numerous, smaller corallites. A. poculata often contains symbiotic zooxanthellae in its tissues  while A. solitaria does not.

Distribution and habitat
It is found on hard surfaces including coral rubble and the underside of plate corals. This coral is found in sheltered shallow water but on a particular stretch of coast on Grand Cayman, a large onshore boulder was found to harbour the remains of numerous colonies of A. solitaria that were carbon-dated to an age of six hundred years. This boulder was likely shifted onshore by a hurricane three hundred and thirty years ago, an event which would have resulted in the death of the corals.

References 

Rhizangiidae
Animals described in 1817